("Red All Saints' Day"), also known as  ("Bloody All-Saints' Day") is the name given to a series of 70 attacks committed by militant members of the Algerian National Liberation Front (FLN) that took place on 1 November 1954—the Catholic festival of All Saints' Day—in French Algeria. It is usually taken as the starting date for the Algerian War which lasted until 1962 and led to Algerian independence from France.

Background

Attacks
Between midnight and 2 am on the morning of All Saints' Day, 70 individual attacks were made by FLN militants against police, military and civilian Pieds noirs targets around French Algeria. Ten people were killed in the coordinated attacks.

Reaction in Paris
A total of three companies of paratroopers also arrived between 1 and 2 November.

On 12 November 1954, Pierre Mendes France, President of the French Council of Ministers declared that the attacks would not be tolerated in a speech to the National Assembly:

Public reaction
The political reaction notwithstanding, the  attacks did not receive much coverage in the French media. The French daily newspaper  ran a single short column on the front page, and  gave it just two columns.

References

1954 in Algeria
Algerian War
Terrorist incidents in Algeria
Massacres in Algeria
Mass murder in 1954
Algerian war crimes
November 1954 events in Africa
1954 murders in Algeria
Terrorist incidents in Africa in 1954
Terrorist incidents in Algeria in the 1950s